Shag Tobacco is the third solo album from Gavin Friday. Once again, Friday teamed up with musician Maurice "The Man" Seezer. Bono and The Edge contribute backing vocals on "Little Black Dress". "The Last Song I'll Ever Sing" was dedicated "in loving memory" of Scottish-Irish street performer Thom McGinty, known as "The Diceman").

This album features a cover of T.Rex's "The Slider".

The second track, "Caruso" is Friday's tribute to Enrico Caruso, the Italian opera singer.

The third track, "Angel", was featured on the soundtrack of the 1996 film, William Shakespeare's Romeo + Juliet.

Patrick McCabe wrote the album liner notes.

Track listing
 "Shag Tobacco" – 4:33
 "Caruso" – 5:41
 "Angel" – 6:03
 "Little Black Dress" – 4:29
 "The Slider" (Marc Bolan) – 3:16
 "Dolls" – 4:10
 "Mr Pussy" – 3:40
 "You Me and World War Three" – 4:39
 "Kitchen Sink Drama" – 5:57
 "My Twentieth Century" – 5:08
 "The Last Song I'll Ever Sing" – 3:48
 "Le Roi d'Amour" – 3:53

Personnel
Gavin Friday – vocals, megaphone (Friday called a "stronzophone") on "Caruso", "The Slider" and "Dolls"
Maurice Seezer – bass, keyboards, accordion, drum programming
Chris Cunningham – guitar, mandolin
Erik Sanko – bass
Renaud Pion – synthesizer, bass clarinet, baritone saxophone, flute, Jew's harp
Dave Clayton – keyboards
Danny Cummings – percussion
Loretta Heyward – background vocals
Bono, The Edge – background vocals on "Little Black Dress"
Tim Simenon – turntables, drum programming
Don Hozz – synthesizer on "Angel"

References

Gavin Friday albums
1995 albums
Albums produced by Tim Simenon